Devadatta was by tradition a Buddhist monk, cousin and brother-in-law of Gautama Siddhārtha.  The accounts of his life vary greatly, but he is generally seen as an evil and divisive figure in Buddhism, who led a breakaway group in the earliest days of the religion.

Etymology 
The name Devadatta means god-given in Palī and Sanskrit.  It is composed from the stem form of deva ("god") and the past participle datta of the verb da ("to give"), composed as a tatpuruṣa compound.  In the Bhagavad Gītā, the conch shell used by Arjuna on the battle-field of Kurukshetra was named Devadatta.  The name Devadatta is still used today.

Scholarship

Mahāsāṃghika Vinaya research 
According to Andrew Skilton, modern scholarship generally agrees that the Mahāsāṃghika Vinaya is the oldest extant Buddhist Vinaya. 

According to Reginald Ray, the Mahāsāṃghika Vinaya mentions the figure of Devadatta, but in a way that is different from the vinayas of the Sthaviravāda branch. According to this study, the earliest vinaya material common to all sects simply depicts Devadatta as a Buddhist saint who wishes for the monks to live a rigorous lifestyle. This has led Ray to regard the story of Devadatta as a legend produced by the Sthavira group.

However, as Bhikkhu Sujato has noted, the Mahāsāṃghika Vinaya does indeed contain material depicting Devadatta as a schismatic figure trying to split the sangha (monastic community). Sujato adds: "The only relevant difference is the grounds he is said to base his attempt on. Whereas the Sthavira Vinayas say he promulgated a set of ‘five points’, by which he tried to enforce an excessively ascetic lifestyle on the monks, the Mahāsaṅghika Vinaya omits the five points and attributes a much more comprehensive agenda to him." Sujato further argues that "The fact that the Devadatta legend, at least the core episodes 13 and 14, is common to all six Vinayas including the Mahāsaṅghika suggests the legend arose among the presectarian community, and in all likelihood harks back to the time of the Buddha himself."

Records from Chinese pilgrims to India 
Faxian and other Chinese pilgrims who travelled to India in the early centuries of the current era recorded the continued existence of "Gotamaka" buddhists, followers of Devadatta. Gotamaka are also referred to in Pali texts of the second and fifth centuries of the current era. The followers of Devadatta are recorded to have honored all the Buddhas previous to Śākyamuni (Gautama Buddha), but not Śākyamuni himself. According to Faxian, Xuanzang and Yijing's writings, some people practised in a similar way and with the same books as common Buddhists, but followed the similar tapas and performed rituals to the past three buddhas and not Śākyamuni.

Theravāda portrayals of Devadatta

Devadatta in the Theravāda Vinaya 

In Cullavagga section VII of the Vinayapiṭaka of the Theravādins which deals with schisms, it is told how Devadatta went forth along with a number of the Buddha's other relatives and clansmen. In the first year he attained psychic power (abhijñā), but made no supermundane achievement.

Looking round to see whom he could convince to honour him he decided to approach Prince Ajātashatru  the heir to the Magadhan throne. Having psychic power he assumed the form of a young boy clad in snakes and sat in the Prince's lap, which very much impressed the prince, who became his disciple.

Ajātashatru began to send great offerings to Devadatta, and the latter became obsessed with his own worth, and began to have thoughts that it was he who should lead the Sangha, not the Buddha, and he didn't desist even though this thought brought down his psychic powers.

When told about the offerings that Devadatta was receiving, the Buddha remarked that all these gains were only going towards his destruction, just as a plantain or a bamboo is destroyed by its fruit.

Shortly thereafter, Devadatta asked the Buddha to retire and let him take over the running of the Sangha. The Buddha retorted that he did not even let his trusted disciples Sāriputta or Moggallāna run the Sangha, much less one like him, who should be vomited like spittle, and he gave a special act of publicity about him, warning the monks that he had changed for the worse.

Seeing the danger in this, Devadatta approached Prince Ajātasattu and encouraged him to kill his Father, the good King Bimbisāra, and meanwhile he would kill the Buddha. The King found out about his plan and gave over the Kingdom into the Prince's control.

Ajātasattu then gave mercenaries to Devadatta who ordered them to kill the Buddha, and in an elaborate plan to cover his tracks he ordered other men to kill the killers, and more to kill them and so on, but when they approached the Buddha they were unable to carry out their orders, and were converted instead.

Devadatta then tried to kill the Buddha himself by throwing a rock at him from on high, while the Buddha was walking on the slopes of a mountain. As this also failed he decided to have the elephant Nāḷāgiri intoxicated and let him loose on the Buddha while he was on almsround. However, the power of the Buddha's loving-kindness overcame the elephant.

Devadatta then decided to create a schism in the order, and collected a few monk friends and demanded that the Buddha accede to the following rules for the monks: they should dwell all their lives in the forest, live entirely on alms obtained by begging, wear only robes made of discarded rags, dwell at the foot of a tree and abstain completely from fish and flesh.

The Buddha refused to make any of these compulsory, however, and Devadatta went round blaming him, saying that he was living in abundance and luxury. Devadatta then decided to create a schism and recite the training rules (pātimokkha) apart from the Buddha and his followers, with 500 newly ordained monks.

The Buddha sent his two Chief Disciples Sāriputta and Moggallāna to bring back the erring young monks. Devadatta thought they had come to join his Sangha and, asking Sāriputta to give a talk, fell asleep. Then the Chief Disciples persuaded the young monks to return to the Buddha.

The Buddha did not show any hatred or deceive, even after what Devadatta had done. Soon after, Devadatta got sick and pretended as realized that what he had done was wrong. He tried to go to the Buddha's place to make false apologize for what he did, but it was too late. On the way to see the Buddha, the earth sucked Devadatta into the Niraya Hell for his evil deeds.

Theravāda account
According to the Pāli Canon, he taught his sangha to adopt five tapas (literally, austerities) throughout their lives:

that monks should dwell all their lives in the forest,
that they should accept no invitations to meals, but live entirely on alms obtained by begging,
that they should wear only robes made of discarded rags and accept no robes from the laity,
that they should dwell at the foot of a tree and not under a roof,
that they should abstain completely from fish and flesh.

The Buddha's reply was that those who felt so inclined could follow these rules – except that of sleeping under a tree during the rainy season – but he refused to make the rules obligatory. They are among the 13 ascetic practices (dhutanga).

His followers (including bhikkhus and bhikkhunis) were new monks from the Vajjī clan.

King Kalābu was one of Devadatta's past lives.

Mahāyāna portrayals of Devadatta

Lotus Sūtra
According to Jacqueline Stone and Stephen F. Teiser, Devadatta was "well known to the sutra's early devotees as the Buddhist archetype of an evildoer." In the context of the "promise of buddhahood for everyone, this chapter became widely understood as illustrating the potential for enlightenment even in evil persons."

In the Lotus Sūtra, chapter 12, found in the Mahāyāna Buddhist tradition, the Buddha teaches that in a past life, Devadatta was his holy teacher who set him on the path, and makes a noteworthy statement about how even Devadatta will in time become a Buddha:

In the Mahāmeghasūtra Devadatta is called a mahāpuruṣa (great being).

Amitāyurdhyāna Sūtra
In the Mahayana Buddhist text, the Amitāyurdhyāna Sūtra, Devadatta is said to have convinced Prince Ajātasattu to murder his father King Bimbisāra and ascend the throne. Ajātasattu follows the advice, and this action (another anantarika-kamma for killing one's own father) prevents him from attaining stream-entry at a later time, when listening to some teaching of the Buddha.  This is confirmed by the Sāmaññaphalasutta of the Dīgha Nikāya (DN 2).

See also
 List of Sri Lankan monarchs
 History of Sri Lanka

References

Bibliography
 
 Deeg, Max (1999). The Saṅgha of Devadatta: Fiction and History of a Heresy in the Buddhist Tradition,  Journal of the International College for Advanced Buddhist Studies 2, 195- 230
 Jataka i. 142
 Mahaavastu, iii. 76
 Matsunami, Yoshihiro (1979), Conflict within the Development of Buddhism, Japanese Journal of Religious Studies 6 (1/2), 329–345
 Mukherjee, Biswadeb (1966). Die Überlieferung von Devadatta, dem Widersacher des Buddha, in den kanonischen Schriften, München: Kitzinger
 Tezuka, Osamu (2006), Devadatta, London: HarperCollins

External links
 Entry in Buddhist Dictionary of Pali Proper Names

Disciples of Gautama Buddha
Family of Gautama Buddha
Indian Buddhists
Heresy in Buddhism